Darkhintuy (Darkhinta) is a rural locality (an ulus) in Zakamensky District, Republic of Buryatia, Russia. The population was 59 as of 2010. There are 4 streets.

Geography 
Darkhintuy is located 35 km north of Zakamensk (the district's administrative centre) by road. Dutulur is the nearest rural locality.

References 

Rural localities in Zakamensky District